Clément Maurice (1853–1933) was a French photographer, film director, and producer.

Career 
First employed in the Lumière factories, where he entered in 1894, he became a portrait photographer in Paris, where he settled in Antoine Lumière's studio at 8 boulevard des Italiens, above the Robert-Houdin Theater, property of the future filmmaker Georges Méliès. This and that allow him to enter the world of cinematography.

From 1898 to 1906, he was the cameraman for surgeon Eugène Doyen for whom he filmed for educational purposes around sixty operations. He worked there with: Ambroise-François Parnaland (1854 - 1913), who founded in 1908 with Charles Jourjon (1876 - 1934) the Éclair Laboratories.

In 1899, the production company Association frères Lumière hired him as a cinematographer collaborator and technician for the shooting of the film Excursion automobile Paris-Meulan. Quickly, he started producing and directing feature films such as Le Duel d'Hamlet or Cyrano de Bergerac.

With Henri Lioret, he developed the Phono-Cinema-Theater, a pioneering system of sound cinema, presented at the Universal Exhibition of 1900.

Filmography 
Producer
1900: Le Duel d'Hamlet 
1900: Jules Moy (Clément-Maurice Gratioulet)
1900: Little Tich et ses Big Boots  (Clément-Maurice Gratioulet)
1900: Madame Sans-Gêne
1900: Mariette Sully (Clément-Maurice Gratioulet)
1900: Mily Mayer (Clément-Maurice Gratioulet)

Director
 1900: Le Duel d'Hamlet
 1900: Madame Sans-Gêne
 1900: Roméo et Juliette
 1900: Cyrano de Bergerac
 1911: L'Inutile Sacrifice

Chief camera operator
1899: Excursion automobile Paris-Meulan produced by l'Association frères Lumière, opérateur 
1912: La Dame aux camélias

References

External links
 
Cyrano de Bergerac short film by Maurice

1853 births
1933 deaths
French film directors
French film producers
French photographers
People from Lot-et-Garonne
Silent film directors
Articles containing video clips
Place of birth missing